The Smart Game Format (SGF) is a computer file format used for storing records of board games. Go is the game that is most commonly represented in this format and is the default. SGF was originally created under a different name by Anders Kierulf for his SmartGO program. The current version of the format is 4.

The main purposes of SGF are to store records of played games and to provide features for storing annotated and analyzed games (e.g. board markup, variations). It is a text-only, tree-based format. The tree structure makes the addition of variations simple.  It is also text-based instead of binary for the sake of portability.

Games stored in SGF format can easily be emailed, posted or processed with text-based tools. Most Internet Go servers and Go software from 1990 support this format.

About the format 

An SGF file is composed of pairs of properties and property values, each of which describes a feature of the game. A partial list of properties appears below.

There is no strict checking of the contents of these tags, so it is possible to put any text into the result tag for example.

Variations are nested in brackets, and also usually assigned letters. The first branch (variation A) is the main branch. This notation stems from Newick format.

Coordinate system for points and moves 

The first letter designates the column (left to right), the second the row (top to bottom). The upper left part of the board is used for smaller boards, e.g. letters "a"-"m" for 13*13.

The author intentionally broke with the tradition of labeling moves (and points) with letters "A"-"T" (excluding "i") and numbers 1-19. Two lower-case letters in the range "a"-"s" were used instead, for reasons of simplicity and compactness.

The upper left corner as origin of the board corresponds to the way most modern computers represent screen coordinates to simplify integration of text and graphics.

Supported games 
Games currently supported are Amazons, Ataxx, Backgammon, Blokus, Byte, Chase, Chess, DVONN, Exxit, Focus, Gess, GIPF, Go, Gobblet, Gomoku+Renju, Hex, Hive, Hnefatafl, Jungle, Kropki, Kuba, Lines of Action, Neutron, Nine men's morris, Octi, Philosopher's Football, Plateau, PÜNCT, Quadrature, Reversi (Othello), Sahara, Shogi, TAMSK, Tantrix, Trax, Tripples, Tumbling Down, TwixT, Xiangqi, YINSH and ZÈRTZ.

Format Versions 
The first version of SGF, FF[1], was conceived by Anders Kierulf in 1987. It is Appendix A in his Ph.D. thesis. FF[3] was written by Martin Müller in 1993. The current version of the SGF is FF[4] by Arno Hollosi, and is supported by most current SGF readers. FF[2] was never made public. The format has been published under the Open Content License. Current development status (2016) is "not active".

Limitations 
 Language: Go is most widely played in China, Japan, and Korea, but the SGF format has no way of specifying different translations for text.
 Metadata: Only a limited, fixed set of metadata can be present, for example, SGF has rank fields, but no way to represent the ranking system in use.

See also 

 Portable Game Notation – Format for recording chess games
 Portable Draughts Notation

References

External links 
 
 Go Problems

Sensei's Library
 SGF Editors
 SGF Web Viewers
 SGF Tools (file conversion, syntax checker, etc.)
 SGF Parsers

Computer file formats
Computer-related introductions in 1987
Go (game) software